Mercader is a Catalan family name. It may refer to:

Caridad Mercader (1892–1975), Spanish communist militant and Soviet agent
Maria Mercader (1965–2020), American journalist and news producer
María Mercader (1918–2011), Spanish film actress and wife of film director Vittorio De Sica
Ramón Mercader (1913–1978), Spanish Communist, known for assassinating Leon Trotsky
Saülo Mercader (born 1944), Spanish artist